This article lists the etymologies of the names of cities across Canada.

Alberta

British Columbia

Manitoba

New Brunswick

Newfoundland and Labrador

Northwest Territories

Nova Scotia

Nunavut

Ontario

Prince Edward Island

Quebec

Saskatchewan

Yukon

See also

Canadian provincial and territorial name etymologies
List of Canadian place names of Ukrainian origin
List of place names in Canada of Aboriginal origin
Locations in Canada with an English name
Name of Canada
Royal eponyms in Canada
Scottish place names in Canada

References

Further reading

etymology
Cities
etymology
Canada